Edward Platt (born 1968) is a British writer. Platt won the John Llewellyn Rhys Prize and a Somerset Maugham Award for his 2000 book Leadville, about the Western Avenue section of the A40 road in London. Platt was born in Chelmsford, Essex, and grew up in Hampshire, Northumberland and the Wirral. Since 1992 he has lived in London.

His second book, The City of Abraham, published in 2012, is about the West Bank city of Hebron.

He was a book reviewer and feature writer between 1995 and 2007 for several national newspapers including The Daily Telegraph, The Daily Express, The Sunday Times and The Guardian, Evening Standard, Financial Times, and Independent on Sunday. He was  contributor to the Big Issue magazine between 1993 and 2000.

Bibliography 
 Leadville (2000)
 The City of Abraham (Picador, 2012)

References

External links
Twitter profile
Platt at the New Statesman
Review of Leadville from the Guardian

1968 births
Living people
English travel writers
English non-fiction writers
Schoolteachers from Essex
Alumni of the University of Oxford
People educated at Winchester College
John Llewellyn Rhys Prize winners
English male non-fiction writers